Pirjo Elise Leppikangas (born 12 September 1987) is a Finnish football defender. She plays for PK-35 Vantaa in the Naisten Liiga.

Club career
Leppikangas has played for PK-35 Vantaa since their second division days and is their captain. In 2010, she played varsity soccer for Campbell Fighting Camels.

International career
She was called up to be part of the national team for the UEFA Women's Euro 2013.

Honours

Club
PK-35 Vantaa
Winner
 Naisten Liiga: 2010, 2011, 2012
 Finnish Women's Cup: 2010

References

External links
 
 Profile at fussballtransfers.com 
 
 Profile at soccerdonna.de 

1987 births
Living people
Finnish women's footballers
Finland women's international footballers
Kansallinen Liiga players
Expatriate women's soccer players in the United States
Finnish expatriate footballers
PK-35 Vantaa (women) players
Women's association football defenders